Marta Sosińska-Janczewska (born 4 October 1939, in Warsaw) is a Polish classical pianist.

She studied at the State Higher School of Music in Warsaw under Zbigniew Drzewiecki.

In 1965 she was awarded 3rd prize at the VII International Chopin Piano Competition.

Marta Sosińska subsequently contributed to a recording of Chopin's complete works. From 1985 to 2002 she held a post as professor at the University of Music Würzburg in Germany, where she lives.

References
 Biography at the Fryderyk Chopin Information Centre.
 Fryderyk Chopin Society - Frédéric Chopin International Piano Competitions, VII edition palmares
  - University of Southern California

Polish classical pianists
Polish women pianists
1939 births
Living people
Prize-winners of the International Chopin Piano Competition
Women classical pianists